Farhan Shubailat (born 1911-died 1979) was a Jordanian ambassador, Minister of Defence, senator and mayor of Amman.

Career
Born into a modest family in Tafila (southern Jordan), Farhan Shubailat was sent to the English school in Salt and then obtained a scholarship that enabled him to enter the American University of Beirut, from which he graduated in 1933.
In 1939 he was lecturer at the military academy in Baghdad, where he professed pan-Arab ideas.
In 1946 he was chief of cabinet of King Abdullah of Jordan. Farhan Shubailat convinced King Abdullah to send his grandson Hussein to study abroad, first in Alexandria, then in England.
In 1947 he was a careful observer of the 1947 Syrian parliamentary election.
From 1948 to 1950 he was ambassador in Beirut (Lebanon).
From 1951 to 1952 he was Chamberlain of King Talal of Jordan, then, after the latter's abdication, member of the regency council (1952-1953).
From 1952 to 1955 he was mayor of Amman.
In 1954 he was envoy in Baghdad.
In 1955 he was Minister of Defense in the cabinet of Sa'id al-Mufti.
From 1956 to 1957 he was ambassador in Bonn (West Germany).
In 1958 he was ambassador in Baghdad, responsible for carrying out the unification project between Jordan and Iraq. He narrowly escaped death during the military coup of 14 July 1958.
From 1959 to 1965 he was Ambassador in Tunis (Tunisia) with concurrent Diplomatic accreditation in Algiers (Algeria), Tripoli (Libya), 1961 in Rabat (Morocco), and 1964 in Baghdad (Iraq).
On October 28, 1965 he was appointed as ambassador in Washington, D.C. where he was accredited   from November 16, 1965 to August 28, 1967. 
From  to  he was ambassador in Bonn, last position before retirement.
On  a Royal Decree was issued appointing Farhan Shubeilat Senator.
As one of the first senior officials of the Kingdom of Jordan, Ambassador Shubailat was very close to Kings Abdullah, Talal and then Hussein. Independent-minded, he was always perfectly loyal and deeply attached to the Hashemite dynasty, especially as it was in line with modern and moderate views.
Ambassador Farhan Shubailat's son, Dr. Gaith F. Shubailat, has served in the Jordan Army Royal Medical Services, at the King Hussein Medical Center, until his retirement in 1984 in the rank of Major General. Dr. Shubailat was instrumental in creating the Jordanian Board of Medical Specialties in 1984 and he served as its first President until 1992. He was also a senator from 1993 to 1997.

References

1911 births
1979 deaths
Ambassadors of Jordan to Lebanon
Ambassadors of Jordan to Iraq
Ambassadors of Jordan to Libya
Ambassadors of Jordan to Germany
Ambassadors of Jordan to the United States
Defence ministers of Jordan
Members of the Senate of Jordan
Mayors of Amman